HM LST-11 was an  of the United States Navy built during World War II. LST-11 was transferred to the Royal Navy in March 1943, before being commissioned into the USN. Like many of her class, she was not named and is properly referred to by her hull designation.

Construction 
LST-11 was laid down on 8 August 1942, at Pittsburgh, Pennsylvania by the Dravo Corporation; launched on 18 November 1942; sponsored by Miss Virginia Fowler; transferred to the Royal Navy on 22 March 1943, and commissioned the following day.

Service history 
LST-11 left from Hampton Roads, Virginia for the Mediterranean on 14 May 1943, with convoy UGS 8A, arriving in Oran, Algeria, sometime before 8 June 1943.

She participated in the Anzio Advanced Landings from January to March of 1944, in the Mediterranean Theatre. LST-11 was sent to Cardiff, Wales, for repairs in May 1944. She then participated in the Normandy landings in June 1944, in the European Theatre. She was then sent to Thames and Portsmouth for repairs in June and August 1944.

LST-11 was then assigned to the Pacific theatre and participated in what was originally planned to be Operation Zipper, the recapture of Malay, in September 1945, but with Japan surrendering this was an unopposed action.

She was paid off at Subic Bay on 13 April 1946.

Final disposition
She was returned to the US Navy on 13 May 1946, and was struck from the Navy list on 5 June 1946. On 5 December 1947, she was sold to Bosey, Philippines.

References

Bibliography

External links
 

 

1942 ships
Ships built in Pittsburgh
LST-1-class tank landing ships of the United States Navy
LST-1-class tank landing ships of the Royal Navy
World War II amphibious warfare vessels of the United States
World War II amphibious warfare vessels of the United Kingdom
Ships built by Dravo Corporation